Antioxidants & Redox Signaling  is a peer-reviewed scientific journal covering reduction–oxidation (redox) signaling and antioxidant research. It covers topics such as reactive oxygen species/reactive nitrogen species (ROS/RNS) as messengers gaseous signal transducers, hypoxia and tissue oxygenation, microRNA, prokaryotic systems, and lessons from plant biology.

Abstracting and indexing
This journal is indexed by the following services:

According to Journal Citation Reports, the journal has a 2014 impact factor of 7.407.

References

Biology journals
Journals published between 27 and 51 times per year
Mary Ann Liebert academic journals